is a Japanese politician from the Toyama Prefecture.  He started his own export-import company at age 28.

He graduated from the Department of Economics at Keio University and ran for the Prefectural Assembly in 1959.  He was elected to the Diet in 1969 as a member of the Liberal Democratic Party.

He served as Vice Minister of International Trade and Industry in 1975 in the Cabinet of Prime Minister Miki, and as Vice Minister of the Post Office under Prime Minister Fukuda, as well as some other cabinet positions through the 1980s. He was Speaker of the House of Representatives from July 2000 to November 2003.

He vigorously opposed Prime Minister Koizumi's plan to privatize the national post office  and formed the People's New Party in 2005 to oppose the plan.  Although Koizumi's party handily won a strong majority in the elections on 11 September 2005, Watanuki crushed the challenger in his district.

References

|-

|-

|-

|-

|-

|-

|-

|-

1927 births
Living people
Speakers of the House of Representatives (Japan)
Members of the House of Representatives (Japan)
Ministers of Construction of Japan
Japanese racehorse owners and breeders
Japanese businesspeople
Kannushi
People from Toyama Prefecture
Keio University alumni
Liberal Democratic Party (Japan) politicians
People's New Party politicians
Recipients of the Order of the Rising Sun
21st-century Japanese politicians